AMC is a European TV channel launched by AMC Networks International. AMC replaced the MGM Channel on 5 November 2014, but in Poland on 6 May 2016. AMC-produced dramas Halt & Catch Fire and The Divide are among the first original series that premiered on the channel. The channel also airs films from MGM, Universal Studios, Paramount Pictures, 20th Century Studios and Sony Pictures Entertainment. The channel launched in the United Kingdom on 28 August 2015, in partnership with BT TV and branded AMC from BT. Until 2019, Sky customers in the UK had access to the channel if they subscribed to 
BT Sport, but was subsequently removed from the platform on 2 October 2019, making the channel exclusive to BT TV subscribers.

The channel launched in the Republic of Ireland in February 2023 on Virgin Media Ireland. 

AMC closed in the Netherlands and Flanders on 31 December 2018 and in Russia on 1 January 2019, where it was replaced by Hollywood channel.

Programming
4th and Loud
Better Call Saul
Breaking Bad
Fear the Walking Dead
Halt and Catch Fire
Hollywood's Best Film Directors
Mad Men
Hap and Leonard (TV series)
Rectify
Sons of Anarchy (Hungary only)

References

External links
AMC Poland
AMC Portugal
AMC Spain
AMC UK

Defunct television channels in the Netherlands
Defunct television channels in Belgium
Defunct television channels in Russia
Television stations in Spain
Television channels in Poland
Television stations in Portugal
Television channels in North Macedonia
Television channels in the United Kingdom
Television channels and stations established in 2014
AMC Networks International